Salacgrīva Port is the port authority of Salacgrīva, Latvia. The port is located at the mouth of Salaca River.

See also 
 Battle of Salis

References

External links 
 

Ports and harbours of Latvia
Port authorities